Zenata – Messali El Hadj Airport  is a public airport located  northwest of Tlemcen, the capital of the Tlemcen province (wilaya) in Algeria.

Facilities

Airlines and destinations
The following airlines operate regular scheduled and charter flights at Tlemcen Airport:

Statistics

References

External links
 Google Maps - Zenata
 Etablissement de Gestion de Services Aéroportuaires d’Alger (EGSA-Alger)
 
 

Airports in Algeria
Buildings and structures in Tlemcen Province